Arlene Helen Sharpe (born in 1953) is an American immunologist and Kolokotrones University Professor at Harvard University and Chair of the Department of Immunology at Harvard Medical School. In 2017, she received the Warren Alpert Foundation Prize with Gordon Freeman, Lieping Chen, James P. Allison and  Tasuku Honjo for their collective contributions to the pre-clinical foundation and development of immune checkpoint blockade, a novel form of cancer therapy that has transformed the landscape of cancer treatment. She served as the hundredth president of the American Association of Immunologists from 2016 to 2017 and served as an AAI Council member from 2013 to 2016. She is the co-director of the Evergrande Center for Immunologic Diseases at Harvard Medical School and Brigham and Women's Hospital.

She graduated from Harvard College and Harvard Medical School.

Awards and honours

 1993: Beckman Young Investigators Award
 2006: Fellow, American Association for Advancement of Science
 2014: William B. Coley Award for Distinguished Research in Tumor Immunology
2017: Warren Alpert Foundation Prize
2018: member, National Academy of Sciences

References

External links
 Sharpe Lab

1953 births
Living people
Women immunologists
American immunologists
American women physicians
Harvard Medical School faculty
Harvard Medical School alumni
Harvard University alumni
Members of the United States National Academy of Sciences
American women academics
21st-century American women
Members of the National Academy of Medicine